Júnior Albini (born 15 March 1991) is a Brazilian professional mixed martial artist who competed in the Heavyweight division of the Ultimate Fighting Championship.

Early life
Albini started boxing at 13 years old to lose weight.

Mixed martial arts career

Early career
Albini made his professional debut in August 2009. Over the next seven years he fought fifteen times and amassed a record of 13-2; 11 of his 13 wins came by stoppage.

Ultimate Fighting Championship
Albini made his promotional debut in the UFC against 11th ranked opponent Timothy Johnson at UFC on Fox: Weidman vs. Gastelum. He won the fight via knockout in the first round. This win earned him the Performance of the Night bonus of US$50 thousand. At the post fight interview, Albini was pleased with the prize money where he stated he now was in the position to buy real toys for his daughter.
It's so much money. I've never seen that kind of money. I was never able to buy her (his daughter) a toy or something like that. All of her toys were like shampoos, empty bottles, because we didn't have much money. My wife was following my dream, too, together, so it means a lot to me right now that I can make a living and give back to them what they suffered together with me – the pursuing of this dream.

Albini faced Andrei Arlovski at UFC Fight Night: Poirier vs. Pettis on 11 November 2017. He lost the fight via unanimous decision.

Albini faced Oleksiy Oliynyk on 12 May 2018, at UFC 224. He lost the fight via submission in the first round.

Albini was scheduled to face Dmitry Sosnovskiy on 2 February 2019, at UFC Fight Night 144. However, Sosnovskiy pulled out of the fight in early January after undergoing surgery to correct a recent injury. Albini instead faced promotional newcomer Jairzinho Rozenstruik. He lost the fight via TKO in the second round, the first TKO loss of his MMA career.

Albini faced Maurice Greene on 29 June 2019 at UFC on ESPN 3. He lost the fight via TKO in the first round.

In January 2020, it was reported that Albini was released by UFC.

Post-UFC career
After the stint in the UFC, Albini made his first appearance against Adnan Alić at Serbian Battle Championship 27 on 14 March 2020. He won the fight via knockout less than a minute into round one.

Albini next faced Gabriel Kanabo at Warriors Combat - on 30 July 2021. He won the fight via knockout in round one.

Albini faced Davi Lucas da Silva at AFT 30 on 31 August 2021. He won the bout via TKO in round one.

Personal life
Albini is married and has a daughter. Before signing with the UFC, Albini worked full-time as a security guard.

Championships and accomplishments
Ultimate Fighting Championship
Performance of the Night (One time) vs. Timothy Johnson
Aspera Fighting Championship
Aspera FC Heavyweight Championship (One time)

Mixed martial arts record

|-
|Win
|align=center|17–6
|Davi Lucas da Silva
|TKO 
|AFT 30
|
|align=center|1
|align=center|2:35
|Curitiba, Brazil
|
|-
|Win
|align=center|16–6
|Gabriel Kanabo
|KO 
|Warriors Combat -
|
|align=center|1
|align=center|2:15
|Curitiba, Brazil
|
|-
|Win
|align=center|15–6
|Adnan Alić
|KO (flying knee)
|Serbian Battle Championship 27
|
|align=center|1
|align=center|0:45
|Vrbas, Serbia
|
|-
|Loss
|align=center|14–6
|Maurice Greene
|TKO (punches)
|UFC on ESPN: Ngannou vs. dos Santos 
|
|align=center|1
|align=center|3:38
|Minneapolis, Minnesota, United States
|
|-
|Loss
|align=center|14–5
|Jairzinho Rozenstruik
|TKO (head kick and punches)
|UFC Fight Night: Assunção vs. Moraes 2
|
|align=center|2
|align=center|0:54
|Fortaleza, Brazil
|
|-
|Loss
|align=center|14–4
|Alexey Oleynik
|Submission (Ezekiel choke)
|UFC 224
|
|align=center|1
|align=center|1:45
|Rio de Janeiro, Brazil
|
|-
|Loss
|align=center|14–3
|Andrei Arlovski
|Decision (unanimous)
|UFC Fight Night: Poirier vs. Pettis
|
|align=center|3
|align=center|5:00
|Norfolk, Virginia, United States
|
|-
|Win
|align=center|14–2
|Timothy Johnson
|TKO (punches)
|UFC on Fox: Weidman vs. Gastelum
|
|align=center|1
|align=center|2:51
|Uniondale, New York, United States
|
|-
|Win
|align=center|13–2
|Jose Rodrigo Guelke
|Decision (unanimous)
|Aspera FC 43
|
|align=center|3
|align=center|5:00
|Paranaguá, Brazil
|
|-
|Win
|align=center|12–2
|Ivan Vičić
|TKO (punches)
|Serbian Battle Championship 10
|
|align=center|1
|align=center|0:58
|Bačka Palanka, Serbia
|
|-
|Win
|align=center|11–2
|Tiago Cardoso
|KO (elbow)
|Aspera Fighting Championship 38
|
|align=center|3
|align=center|4:45
|Barueri, Brazil
|
|-
|Win
|align=center|10–2
|Paulo Ferreira
|Submission (heel hook)
|Aspera FC 14
|
|align=center|1
|align=center|1:12
|Lages, Brazil
|
|-
|Win
|align=center|9–2
|Arley Simetti
|Submission (armbar)
|Aspera FC 13
|
|align=center|1
|align=center|2:22
|Itapema, Brazil
|
|-
|Win
|align=center|8–2
|Diogo Joaquim Silveira
|KO (knee)
|Aspera FC 11
|
|align=center|1
|align=center|3:37
|Curitibanos, Brazil
|
|-
|Win
|align=center|7–2
|Bruno Polaco
|Submission (arm-triangle choke)
|Aspera FC 8
|
|align=center|1
|align=center|0:36
|Paranaguá, Brazil
|
|-
|Win
|align=center|6–2
|Alison Vicente
|Decision (unanimous)
|Smash Fight 3: Rising Stars
|
|align=center|3
|align=center|5:00
|Curitiba, Brazil
|
|-
|Win
|align=center|5–2
|Julio Bizzarri
|Submission (Guillotine choke)
|Felino Fight 3
|
|align=center|1
|align=center|0:42
|Criciúma, Brazil
|
|-
|Loss
|align=center|4–2
|Alberto Emiliano Pereira
|Submission (triangle choke)
|Nitrix Champion Fight 12
|
|align=center|2
|align=center|2:42
|Blumenau, Brazil
|
|-
|Loss
|align=center|4–1
|Nelson Jaca
|Submission (rear-naked choke)
|Power Fight Extreme 6
|
|align=center|2
|align=center|2:53
|Curitiba, Brazil
|
|-
|Win
|align=center|4–0
|Fernando Tressino
|TKO (knee)
|Max Fight 9
|
|align=center|1
|align=center|2:01
|Campinas, Brazil
|
|-
|Win
|align=center|3–0
|Everton Panda
|Submission (armbar)
|CM System: Challenger
|
|align=center|1
|align=center|0:50
|Curitiba, Brazil
|
|-
|Win
|align=center|2–0
|Marcos Vinicius
|Submission (triangle choke)
|Arena Gold Fights 2
|
|align=center|1
|align=center|3:55
|Curitiba, Brazil
|
|-
|Win
|align=center|1–0
|Bruno Alboitt
|TKO (punches)
|Paranaguá Fight 5
|
|align=center|1
|align=center|4:10
|Paranaguá, Brazil
|
|-

References

External links
 
 

1991 births
Living people
Brazilian male mixed martial artists
Brazilian practitioners of Brazilian jiu-jitsu
Heavyweight mixed martial artists
Mixed martial artists utilizing boxing
Mixed martial artists utilizing Luta Livre
Mixed martial artists utilizing Brazilian jiu-jitsu
Ultimate Fighting Championship male fighters
People from Paranaguá
Sportspeople from Paraná (state)